Seventh Heaven is a 1997 French drama film directed by Benoît Jacquot.

Cast 
 Sandrine Kiberlain - Mathilde
 Vincent Lindon - Nico
 François Berléand - The doctor
 Francine Bergé - Mathilde's mother
 Pierre Cassignard - Étienne
 Florence Loiret Caille - Chloé
 Eriq Ebouaney

References

External links 

1997 drama films
1997 films
French drama films
Films directed by Benoît Jacquot
1990s French films